Batrachichnus is an amphibian ichnogenus commonly found in assemblages of ichnofossils dating to the Mississippian to Triassic of North America, South America, and Europe. The animal producing the tracks was likely a temnospondyl. B. slamandroides is the smallest known tetrapod footprint, produced by an animal with an estimated body length of just

Description
The tracks show four toes and part or all of the palms. Pes (rear foot) prints often overstep the manus (front foot) prints. The digits were short and blunt. Toe drags are common.

Some trackways show a transition from a walking to a running gait.

References

Vertebrate trace fossils